Capitaine Georges Pelletier d'Oisy (1892–1953) was a French aviator and World War I ace. He attempted a circumnavigation of the world in 1924. Pelletier d'Oisy began his aviation career as a World War I flying ace credited with five aerial victories.

Biography

Early life and training
See also Aerial victory standards of World War I

Georges Pelletier D'Oisy was born in Auch on 9 March 1892. He enlisted for five years on 23 May 1910. He served as a Dragoon until 14 October 1912, when he entered pilot training. He graduated with Military Pilot's Brevet No. 284 on 18 June 1913, and was posted to Escadrille HF.19 on 1 July.

World War I service
When the First World War began, Pelletier d'Oisy  was serving with Escadrille HF.19. On 20 November 1914, he received one of the first Médaille militaires awarded in the war.

He transferred to Escadrille MS.12 on 1 March 1915. On 2 April, he scored one of the first aerial victories in history when he shot down an Albatros reconnaissance plane. Six days later, he was appointed as a Chevalier de la Legion d'honneur. On 27 September, he was promoted from the ranks to be a Sous lieutenant.

He scored two more aerial victories, on 12 and 17 May 1916. On 18 May he was transferred to a fighter squadron, Escadrille N.69. He and Jean Navarre teamed to shoot down a German Fokker on 18 June 1916 for d'Oisy's fourth victory. He would score a fifth victory to become a flying ace on 11 May 1917. On 27 September, he became a full Lieutenant.

On 30 December 1917, he was withdrawn from his squadron to serve on the staff of Groupe de Combat 16. He would serve in this position until 26 October 1918, when he was posted back to his former unit, now known as Escadrille Spa.69.

Aviation record activities

On 24 April 1924, Pelletier d'Oisy and Adjutant Lucien Besin departed Paris eastbound in a Breguet 19.A.2 in an attempt to fly around the world. Their attempt ended when they crashed their airplane on a golf course in Shanghai, China. They had covered 10,580 miles (17,037 km) in 26 days.

Pelletier d'Oisy was in Hong Kong when a British Royal Air Force team of aviators making an eastbound attempt to circumnavigate the world arrived there on 30 June 1924, and he traded flying stories with Squadron Leader Archibald Stuart-MacLaren and Flying Officer William Plenderleith of the British team. Shortly after that, he departed for Tokyo, Japan, in a Breguet 14 he had borrowed from the Republic of China government, arriving there on 17 July 1924. The entire trip from Paris to Tokyo had taken 120 hours in the air over 84 days.

In June 1925, flying a Blériot-SPAD S.61, he won the Michelin Cup, completing the  course in 15hr 8 min.

World War II and beyond

Having served in both Indochina and Tunisia, d'Oisy rose to the rank of General by the end of the Second World War. He died in Morocco on 10 May 1953.

Honors
 Chevalier of the Legion d'honneur: 8 April 1915 (later raised to Commandeur) in the Legion
 Medaille Militaire: 20  November 1914 
 Croix de Guerre with four palmes and an etoile de vermeil
 The inaugural Harmon Trophy in 1926

End notes

Reference
 Franks, Norman; Bailey, Frank (1993). Over the Front: The Complete Record of the Fighter Aces and Units of the United States and French Air Services, 1914–1918 London, UK: Grub Street Publishing. .

 Thomas Lowell (1925). The First World Flight - Being the Personal Narratives of Lowell Smith, Erik Nelson, Leigh Wade, Leslie Arnold, Henry Ogden, John Harding. Cambridge Houghton Mifflin. ASIN: B01HWXRXRK.

1892 births
1953 deaths
People from Auch
French World War I flying aces
Commandeurs of the Légion d'honneur
Recipients of the Croix de Guerre 1914–1918 (France)